The 2009 Premier League season was the second division of motorcycle speedway racing in the United Kingdom and the 15th season since its creation in 1995. The league is governed by the Speedway Control Board (SCB), in conjunction with the British Speedway Promoters' Association (BSPA).

Summary
The League consisted of 14 teams for the 2009 season with the re-admission of the Newport Wasps and the loss of Mildenhall Fen Tigers, Isle of Wight Islanders (Both dropped to National League) and the Reading Racers (Loss of Stadium). New rules introduced for 2009 with a complete revamp of the points scoring system. The team finishing at the top of the league table at the end of the season after accumulating the most points were declared the Premier League champions. The four highest placed teams were entered into promotion play-offs, whereby the Premier League play-off winner faced the bottom Elite League team over two legs. Teams finishing in fifth to twelfth at the time of the fixture cut-off date compete in the Young Shield.

The Kings Lynn Stars were crowned the Premier League champions after ending the season as the highest placed team. The Edinburgh Monarchs finished second, Newcastle Diamonds third and the Birmingham Brummies fourth. All four teams took part in the promotion play-off with Edinburgh and King's Lynn reaching the final. Edinburgh won 97–83 on aggregate and faced Elite League team Belle Vue Aces, but lost the two-legged promotion/relegation final.

New Points Scoring System
A new points scoring systems was devised for the 2009 season in an effort to make teams more competitive even when losing. If a Home team were to win by 7 or more points they would receive 3 points for the win. However, if the away team restricted the win from 1-6 points, the home team would receive only 2 points for the win, and the away team would be awarded 1 point for losing by less than 7 away from home.
If the match was a draw, the home team would be awarded 1 point and the away team awarded 2.
If the away team won the match by between 1-6 points, they would be awarded 3 points with the home team collecting 0. And finally if the away team won by 7 or more points, they would collect 4 points with the home team again collecting 0.

League table

Home: 3W = Home win by 7 points or more; 2W = Home win by between 1 and 6 points 
Away: 4W = Away win by 7 points or more; 3W = Away win by between 1 and 6 points; 1L = Away loss by 6 points or less
M = Meetings; D = Draws; L = Losses; F = Race points for; A = Race points against; +/- = Race points difference; Pts = Total Points

Last updated: October 20, 2010

Source: BSPA

Premier League play-offs

Semi-finals

Leg 1

Leg 2

Grand final

First leg

Second leg

Premier League Riders Championship

Premier League Knockout Cup
The 2009 Premier League Knockout Cup was the 42nd edition of the Knockout Cup for tier two teams. King's Lynn Stars were the winners of the competition.

First round

Quarter-finals

Semi-finals

Final
First leg

Second leg

King's Lynn were declared Knockout Cup Champions, winning on aggregate 98–81.

Final Leading averages

Riders & final averages
Berwick

Michal Makovský 8.49
Josef Franc 8.28
Stanisław Burza 7.60 
Paul Clews 7.39 
William Lawson 6.02 
Tero Aarnio 5.55
Guglielmo Franchetti 4.43
Danny Warwick 4.00
Tamas Sike 2.81
Greg Blair 2.33

Birmingham

Tomasz Piszcz 8.64
Jason Lyons 8.42
Richard Sweetman 7.20 
Russell Harrison 6.91 
Ludvig Lindgren 6.73
Robert Ksiezak 6.12
Lee Smart 5.25
Manuel Hauzinger 5.10
Jay Herne 4.64
Marek Mroz 3.52
James Cockle 3.13
Ben Taylor 2.31

Edinburgh

Ryan Fisher 8.89 
Kevin Wolbert 8.87
Andrew Tully 7.83 
Matthew Wethers 7.74 
Thomas H. Jonasson 7.44
Michał Rajkowski 7.06
Aaron Summers 6.26 
Sean Stoddart 3.53
Byron Bekker 3.17
Max Dilger 2.54

Glasgow

James Grieves 8.97
Shane Parker 8.93 
William Lawson 7.79
Josh Grajczonek 6.78
Russell Harrison 5.76
Anders Andersen 5.50
Lee Dicken 4.91
Mitchell Davey 4.51
Peter Juul 2.40

King's Lynn

Darcy Ward 9.71
Tomáš Topinka 9.62 
Chris Schramm 8.49
Emiliano Sanchez 8.12
Kozza Smith 7.40
Christian Henry 6.93
Linus Eklöf 6.39
Jan Graversen 5.92
Darren Mallett 5.08

Newcastle

Mark Lemon 9.17
Kenni Larsen 8.19
René Bach 8.17
Jason King 7.83
Derek Sneddon 5.86
Steve Boxall 5.57
Trent Leverington 5.52
Craig Branney 4.78
Adam McKinna 4.10
Casper Wortmann 2.18

Newport

Mark Lemon 8.00
Leigh Lanham 7.64
Jordan Frampton 7.36
Paul Fry 6.40
Chris Kerr 6.19
Brent Werner 6.00
James Holder 5.20
Jonas Andersson 4.14
Kyle Newman 2.26

Redcar

Ty Proctor 8.55
Gary Havelock 8.23
Ben Wilson 7.90
Carl Stonehewer 6.97
Robbie Kessler 6.59
Stuart Swales 5.18
Benji Compton 3.85
Arlo Bugeja 3.52

Rye House

Chris Neath 7.82
Linus Sundström 7.46
Robert Mear 7.42
Joe Haines 7.39
Luke Bowen 6.97
Andrew Silver 6.20
Tommy Allen 5.11

Scunthorpe

David Howe 9.18
Magnus Karlsson 8.67 
Carl Wilkinson 7.04
Simon Lambert 5.77
Viktor Bergström 5.67
Ritchie Hawkins 5.08
Jerran Hart 4.89
Byron Bekker 3.52

Sheffield

Ricky Ashworth 8.42 
Richard Hall 7.88 
Josh Auty 7.51
Joel Parsons 6.21
Chris Mills 5.88
Hugh Skidmore 5.87
Paul Cooper 5.71
Ritchie Hawkins 5.39
Scott Smith 4.53

Somerset

Steve Johnston 9.46
Emil Kramer 8.79
Cory Gathercole 8.23 
Simon Walker 5.77
Justin Sedgmen 5.16
Nick Simmons 4.89
Jay Herne 4.57
Tom Brown 4.30
Jari Makinen 2.27

Stoke

Jason Bunyan 8.55
Lee Complin 7.63
Phil Morris 5.89
Klaus Jakobsen 5.82
Tom P. Madsen 5.76
Jesper Kristiansen 5.62
Robert Ksiezak 5.06
Craig Branney 4.00
Glen Phillips 3.38

Workington

Kevin Doolan 9.35 
Adrian Rymel 8.74 
Andre Compton 8.18
Richard Lawson 5.57
John Branney 5.37
Charles Wright 5.36
Craig Cook 3.93
Luke Priest 2.54

See also
List of United Kingdom Speedway League Champions
Knockout Cup (speedway)

References

Speedway Premier League
Premier League
Speedway Premier League